Hypomyces lithuanicus is a parasitic ascomycete in the Hypocreales order. The fungus produces a cream-ochre to cinnamon-colored granular or velvety growth of mycelium on the surfaces of the gills of agaric fungi like Lactarius torminosus, causing them to be deformed.

References

Fungi described in 1969
Hypocreaceae
Inedible fungi
Parasitic fungi